Sean Munro  is head of the division of cell biology at the Medical Research Council (MRC) Laboratory of Molecular Biology (LMB).

References

Year of birth missing (living people)
Living people
Fellows of the Royal Society
Members of the European Molecular Biology Organization